The 2006 AFC Beach Soccer championship also known as the 2006 FIFA Beach Soccer World Cup qualifiers for (AFC) was the first beach soccer championship for Asia, held in May 2006, in Dubai, United Arab Emirates.
Bahrain won the championship, with Japan finishing second and Iran winning the third place-play off, to claim third. The three teams moved on to play in the 2006 FIFA Beach Soccer World Cup in Rio de Janeiro, Brazil from November 2 - November 12.

Competing nations

 (hosts)

Group stage

Group A

Group B

Knockout stage

Winners

Final standings

References

Beach Soccer Championship
AFC Beach Soccer Championship
International association football competitions hosted by the United Arab Emirates
Beach
2006 in beach soccer